Irma Martínez Manríquez  is a Mexican politician affiliated with the New Alliance Party. As of 2014 she served as Senator of the LX Legislature of the Mexican Congress representing Aguascalientes as replacement of Rafael Ochoa Guzmán.

References

Year of birth missing (living people)
Living people
People from Mexicali
Women members of the Senate of the Republic (Mexico)
Members of the Senate of the Republic (Mexico)
New Alliance Party (Mexico) politicians
21st-century Mexican politicians
21st-century Mexican women politicians
Politicians from Baja California